Domenico Franco (born 9 September 1992) is an Italian football player. He plays for  club Lucchese.

Club career
He made his Serie B debut for Salernitana on 15 May 2010 in a game against Sassuolo.

On 16 July 2019, he signed a 2-year contract with Cesena.

On 28 July 2020 he moved to Virtus Francavilla.

On 9 August 2022, Franco signed a one-year contract, with an option to extend, with Lucchese.

References

External links
 

1992 births
Sportspeople from the Province of Cosenza
Footballers from Calabria
Living people
Italian footballers
U.S. Salernitana 1919 players
Paganese Calcio 1926 players
A.C. ChievoVerona players
A.C.R. Messina players
A.S.D. Roccella players
S.F. Aversa Normanna players
S.S. Monopoli 1966 players
Virtus Francavilla Calcio players
Lucchese 1905 players
Serie B players
Serie C players
Serie D players
Association football midfielders